The Galley Slave (German: Der Galeerensträfling) is a 1919 German silent historical adventure film directed by Rochus Gliese and Paul Wegener and starring Wegener, Lyda Salmonova, and Paul Hartmann. Inspired by several of the novels of Honoré de Balzac including Lost Illusions, it was released in two parts on separate dates during October 1919. Although Gliese was the principal credited director, the film's star Wegener also worked on its production.

It was shot at the Templehof Studios in Berlin, with sets designed by the art director Kurt Richter.

Cast
 Paul Wegener as Colin, König der Galeerensträflinge 
 Lyda Salmonova as Victorine 
 Paul Hartmann as Rastignac 
 Ernst Deutsch as Galeerensträfling 
 Else Berna as Herzogin Maufrigneuse 
 Adele Sandrock
 Lothar Müthel
 Jakob Tiedtke
 Armin Schweizer
 Hedwig Gutzeit

References

Bibliography
 Paul Matthew St. Pierre. Cinematography in the Weimar Republic: Lola Lola, Dirty Singles, and the Men Who Shot Them. Rowman & Littlefield, 2016.

External links

1919 films
Films of the Weimar Republic
German silent feature films
Films directed by Paul Wegener
Films directed by Rochus Gliese
1910s historical adventure films
Films shot at Tempelhof Studios
UFA GmbH films
German historical adventure films
German black-and-white films
Films set in France
Silent historical adventure films
1910s German films